Callancyla is a genus of beetles in the family Cerambycidae, containing the following species:

 Callancyla atrocoerulea Zajciw, 1970
 Callancyla bimaculata (Gounelle, 1911)
 Callancyla capixaba Monné, 1997
 Callancyla cribellum (Bates, 1885)
 Callancyla croceicollis (White, 1855)
 Callancyla curvicollis (Buquet, 1857)
 Callancyla malleri Fuchs, 1966
 Callancyla tucumana Viana, 1971

References

Trachyderini